Brandtzæg is a Norwegian surname that may refer to
Birger Brandtzæg (1893–1971), Norwegian merchant
Per Brandtzæg (1936–2016), Norwegian physician
Svein Richard Brandtzæg (born 1957), Norwegian chemist and business executive
Torgeir Brandtzæg (born 1941), Norwegian ski jumper

Norwegian-language surnames